Haigui is a Chinese language slang term for Chinese nationals who have returned to mainland China after having studied abroad. The term is a pun on the homophonic hǎiguī  meaning "sea turtle". 

Graduates from foreign universities used to be highly sought out by employers in China, but at least one study has indicated they are now less likely to receive callback from jobs compared to Chinese students with a Chinese degree, possibly because of several reasons, such as the rising of the standings of domestic education institutions, and the high salary demands of haigui. 

Over 800,000 recently graduated haigui returned to China in 2020, an increase  of 70% from 2019, largely due to the impact of the COVID-19 pandemic.

Motivations
Some haigui have returned to China due to the late-2000s recession in the U.S. and Europe. According to PRC government statistics, only a quarter of the 1.2 million Chinese people who have gone abroad to study in the past 30 years have returned. As MIT Sloan School of Management professor Yasheng Huang, an American, states:
The Chinese educational system is terrible at producing workers with innovative skills for Chinese economy. It produces people who memorize existing facts rather than discovering new facts; who fish for existing solutions rather than coming up with new ones; who execute orders rather than inventing new ways of doing things. In other words they do not solve problems for their employers.

Etymology
The word is a pun, as  hai  means "ocean" and gui  is a homophone of gui  meaning "to return". The name was first used by Ren Hong, a young man returning to China as a graduate of Yale University seven years after leaving aboard a tea freighter from Guangzhou to the United States.

Notable haigui
Sun Yat-Sen, first president of the Republic of China
Zhou Enlai, first premier and foreign minister of the People's Republic of China
Deng Xiaoping, elder of the Chinese Communist Party
Qian Xuesen, father of the Chinese rocket program

See also
Gireogi appa
Kikokushijo
Daigou

References

External links
Schott's Vocabulary: Haigui New York Times January 12, 2009

Chinese words and phrases
Neologisms
Economy of China
Great Recession
Recruitment